Cavaria con Premezzo is a comune (municipality) in the Province of Varese in the Italian region Lombardy, located about  northwest of Milan and about  south of Varese.

Cavaria con Premezzo borders the following municipalities: Besnate, Cassano Magnago, Gallarate, Jerago con Orago, Oggiona con Santo Stefano.

It is served by Cavaria-Oggiona-Jerago railway station.

References

Cities and towns in Lombardy